Ákos Molnár (December10, 1893February 1945) was a Hungarian writer.

Life
Ákos Molnár was born on December 10, 1893, in Budapest, into a middle-class Hungarian Jewish family. He was learning to become a violinist but lost one of his arms in World War I, and got shell shock. At first, Molnár worked as a bank employee, but later completely resorted to writing.

His works mostly deal with the bourgeoisie, either based on his own experiences, or using historical figures. His style is vivid and light. One of his novels, was awarded with a Mikszáth Award in 1929. Nyugat and Népszava published some of his works. —another one of his novels, a deviation both in style and in topic—covers the life of Katalin Varga, the leader of the 1840s Transylvanian miners' movement. Some of his works were translated into French, Portuguese, and German.

In February 1945, German soldiers dragged him and his wife from their home, and executed them.

After his death, his works were not published again until 1963, when a collection of short stories, tilted Jóslat, became available. Next, some of his novels were republished starting from 2005.

Bibliography
Gyereknek lenni (short stories, 1926)
 (novel, 1929)
Jóslat (seven short stories, 1932)
 (novel, 1933)
 (novel, 1935)
 (novel, 1937)
 (novel, 1941)

References
 
 

1893 births
1945 deaths
20th-century Hungarian novelists
Hungarian male novelists
Hungarian Jews who died in the Holocaust
Writers from Budapest
20th-century Hungarian male writers
Hungarian people executed by Nazi Germany
Hungarian civilians killed in World War II
Austro-Hungarian military personnel of World War I